Day-Vandevander Mill — also known as the Old Mill at Harman — is a historic grist mill located near Harman, Randolph County, West Virginia.  The original structure was built about 1877, and is a mortice and tenon, hand hewn post and beam structure. The additions built in the 1920s are studded wall frame construction. The property includes the original mill pond and tail race.  It is open as a mill museum.

It was listed on the National Register of Historic Places in 1987.

References

External links
Old Mill Museum

History museums in West Virginia
Grinding mills on the National Register of Historic Places in West Virginia
Industrial buildings completed in 1877
Buildings and structures in Randolph County, West Virginia
Museums in Randolph County, West Virginia
Mill museums in the United States
Grinding mills in West Virginia
National Register of Historic Places in Randolph County, West Virginia
1877 establishments in West Virginia